Saint Mary Mother of the Redeemer Church is a parish in the Roman Catholic Diocese of Toledo. The current church is located at 38 W. League Street, Norwalk, Ohio. Construction on the building began on May 29, 1889, and was completed in 1894. The church was previously twinned with St. Alphonsus in Peru, Ohio, but was later twinned with St. Anthony in Milan, Ohio, after a mass restructuring of the diocese.

Buildings
The Century House was a name given to several buildings, now all demolished, within the parish. The first Century House was built in 1904 as a rectory, but was later used to house the church's nuns. The second Century House was also a former rectory close to the church that was re-purposed several times and at differing times served as a nunnery, meeting hall, and preschool. This building was demolished in 2008.

Gallery

References

External links

Churches in the Roman Catholic Diocese of Toledo
Churches in Huron County, Ohio
Norwalk, Ohio